"J'aime... regarder les filles"' (or "J'aime regarder les filles", "I Love Looking at Girls") is a song by French singer and songwriter Patrick Coutin. It was released in 1981 as a single and on his debut album titled Coutin  (or J'aime regarder les filles).

The song became emblematic of the 1980s in France.

Writing and composition 
The song was written by Patrick Coutin.

Track listings 
7" single Epic EPC 9473 (1981)
A. "J'aime... regarder les filles" (5:01)
B. "Lady Mandrax" (2:50)

Charts

Cover versions 
The song has been covered, among others, by Rachida Brakni (in 2009 under the title "J'aime regarder les mecs", meaning "I Love Looking at Guys"), Vitor Hublot (in 2012), and Liane Foly (in 2016).

References

External links 
 Articles
 J'aime écouter "J'aime regarder les filles" — France Inter
 Coutin – "J'aime... regarder les filles" (single) at Discogs

1981 songs
1981 singles
Epic Records singles